Freaky is a New Zealand anthology children's television series that was produced by Avalon Productions and funded by NZ on Air. It features episodes about children facing odd phenomena and eerie situations. Usually the protagonist is a boy or girl who starts by trying to do something normal and ordinary, and ends up facing an alien, supernatural or weird force of some kind. This is both a fantasy and science fiction show, with aliens, portals and time travel. Often it has a low level horror aspect as well, as in ghost visitations. It is comparable to a children's version of The Twilight Zone and The Outer Limits. It is set in New Zealand in ordinary locations such as houses, malls and schools.

It originally aired on TV2 on Sunday evenings at 5:00pm from 14 September to 14 December 2003 as well as TVNZ 6 New Zealand from September 2010 to December 2010. It also aired on ABC from early 2004 to mid 2009 and later on ABC3 in late 2009 to early 2010 in Australia.

Synopsis
Fresh and funky short dramas for children that explore the bizarre, the ridiculous and sometimes frightening ways that everyday life might turn weird – just when it's least expected!

See also
The Killian Curse

References

External links

2000s New Zealand television series
2003 New Zealand television series debuts
2003 New Zealand television series endings
Anthology television series
Horror fiction television series
New Zealand children's television series
New Zealand science fiction television series
Television shows set in Wellington
Television shows funded by NZ on Air
TVNZ 2 original programming